Nahouri is one of the 45 provinces of Burkina Faso, located in the Centre-Sud administrative region. In 2019 the population was 195,608. Its capital is Pô.

Education
In 2011 the province had 109 primary schools and 20 secondary schools.

Healthcare
In 2011 the province had 19 health and social promotion centers (Centres de santé et de promotion sociale), 3 doctors and 67 nurses.

Departments

References

See also:
Regions of Burkina Faso
Provinces of Burkina Faso
Departments of Burkina Faso

 
Provinces of Burkina Faso